The 1928 Bowling Green Falcons football team was an American football team that represented Bowling Green State Normal School (later Bowling Green State University) as a member of the Northwest Ohio League (NOL) during the 1928 college football season. In their fifth season under head coach Warren Steller, the Falcons compiled a 5–0–2 record (3–0–1 against NOL opponents), won the NOL championship, and outscored opponents by a total of 84 to 18. Harry Gwynn was the team captain.

Schedule

References

Bowling Green
Bowling Green Falcons football seasons
Northwest Ohio League football champion seasons
College football undefeated seasons
Bowling Green Falcons football